Events in 1997 in animation.

Events

January
 January 5: The Simpsons episode "El Viaje Misterioso de Nuestro Jomer" is first broadcast, guest starring musician Johnny Cash. 
 January 7: The U.S. animation studio Frederator Studios is founded.
 January 12: 
 The first episode of King of the Hill is broadcast.
 The Simpsons episode "The Springfield Files" is first broadcast as a crossover with The X-Files; it also guest stars Leonard Nimoy, Gillian Anderson and David Duchovny. 
 January 19: The Simpsons episode "The Twisted World of Marge Simpson" is first broadcast, guest starring Jack Lemmon.

February
 February 2: The Simpsons episode "Mountain of Madness" is first broadcast. 
 February 7: The Simpsons episode "Simpsoncalifragilisticexpiala(Annoyed Grunt)cious" is first broadcast as a parody of Mary Poppins. 
 February 8: The final episode of the Sailor Moon, anime airs.
 February 9: The Simpsons episode "The Itchy & Scratchy & Poochie Show" is first broadcast, with the series breaking the record of The Flintstones as the longest-running U.S. primetime animated TV series.
 February 16: The Simpsons episode "Homer's Phobia" is first broadcast, guest starring John Waters; it is also the first LGBT-based episode of the series.
 February 23: The Simpsons episode "Brother from Another Series" is first broadcast as a crossover with Frasier; it also guest stars Kelsey Grammer and David Hyde Pierce.

March
 March 2: The Simpsons episode "My Sister, My Sitter" is first broadcast. 
 March 3: Daria, a spin-off series of Beavis and Butt-Head airs its first episode. 
 March 15: Neon Genesis Evangelion: Death & Rebirth premieres, the first film in the Neon Genesis Evangelion series.
 March 16: The Simpsons episode "Homer vs. the Eighteenth Amendment" is first broadcast, guest starring Dave Thomas. 
 March 24: 69th Academy Awards: Quest by Tyron Montgomery and Thomas Stellmach wins the Academy Award for Best Animated Short Film.
 March 26: Mark Dindal's Cats Don't Dance premiers.

April
 April 1: 
 As an April Fools' Day joke, Cartoon Network reruns Tex Avery's Screwy Squirrel cartoon Happy-Go-Nutty for 12 hours straight.
 The Pokémon anime first airs in Japan. 
 April 2: The first episode of Hikarian is broadcast.
 April 6: The Simpsons episode "Grade School Confidential" is first broadcast where Seymour Skinner and Edna Krabappel become a couple.
 April 7: The first episode of The Kindaichi Case Files airs.
 April 13: The Simpsons episode "The Canine Mutiny" is first broadcast. 
 April 17: The first episode of Blake and Mortimer, based on the eponymous comics series Blake and Mortimer by Edgar P. Jacobs, is broadcast.
 April 19: 
 The first episode of The Angry Beavers airs.
 In the Duckman episode "Duckman and Cornfed in 'Haunted Society Plumbers'", Dan Castellaneta has a surprise cameo appearance as Homer Simpson.
 April 20: The Simpsons episode "The Old Man and the Lisa" is first broadcast, guest starring Bret Hart. 
 April 21: Matt Groening founded the animation production company The Curiosity Company, which would later produce Futurama.
 April 27: The Simpsons episode "In Marge We Trust" is first broadcast.

May
 May 4: The Simpsons episode "Homer's Enemy" is first broadcast, featuring the one-time character of Frank Grimes.
 May 11: The Simpsons episode "The Simpsons Spin-Off Showcase" is first broadcast featuring three fictional spin-offs of the series starring various characters and guest starring Tim Conway and Gailard Sartain. 
 May 16: Todd McFarlane's Spawn, based on the comic series Spawn, is first broadcast.
 May 18: The Simpsons episode "The Secret War of Lisa Simpson" is first broadcast, guest starring Willem Dafoe.

June
 June 5: The Japanese animation studio Bee Train is founded.
 June 14: The first episode of The Adventures of Paddington Bear is broadcast, based on the eponymous children's book series.
 June 15: The Walt Disney Company releases Hercules, directed by Ron Clements and John Musker.

July
 July 12: Hayao Miyazaki's Princess Mononoke premiers.
 July 15: The first episode of Cow and Chicken is broadcast.
 July 19: Hideaki Anno and Kazuya Tsurumaki's The End of Evangelion premiers.
 July 22: The first episode of I Am Weasel is broadcast.
 July 26: A Chinese Ghost Story: The Tsui Hark Animation premiers.

August
 August 13: The first episode of South Park is broadcast. It marks the debut of Stan Marsh, Kyle Broflovski, his baby brother Ike, Kenny McCormick, Eric Cartman, Mr. Garrison, Wendy Testaburger, Butters Stotch, Bebe Stevens, Token Black, Officer Barbrady and Chef.
 August 24: The first episode of Franklin airs.
 August 27: The South Park episode "Volcano" is first broadcast, in which Randy Marsh makes his debut.

September
 September 1: The first episode of 101 Dalmatians: The Series, produced by the Walt Disney Company, is broadcast.
 September 3: The South Park episode "Big Gay Al's Big Gay Boat Ride" is first broadcast, in which Big Gay Al makes his debut.
 September 5: The first episode of Kipper airs.
 September 8: Bill Plympton's I Married a Strange Person! premiers.
 September 13: 
 The first episode of Pepper Ann is broadcast.
 The first episode of Recess, produced by the Walt Disney Company, is broadcast.
 The first episode of Science Court (later renamed Squiggle Vision) is broadcast.
 September 17: The South Park episode "Death" is first broadcast, in which Terrance and Phillip make their debut.
 September 28: The Simpsons episode "The Principal and the Pauper" is first broadcast, where Principal Skinner is revealed to be an impostor, an episode which will prove to be controversial among long-time fans. Many fans believed that this episode is when the show jumped the shark.
 September 29: The first episode of Noah's Island airs.

October
 October 2: The first episode of Space Goofs is broadcast.
 October 13: The first episode of Fennec is broadcast.
 October 17: Teletoon is launched in Canada.
 The first episode of Ned's Newt is broadcast on Teletoon. The show would eventually air on Fox Kids in 1998.
 October 24: The first episode of Freaky Stories airs.
 October 29: The South Park episode "Pinkeye" is first broadcast, in which Principal Victoria makes her debut.

November
 November 2: The Simpsons episode "The Cartridge Family" is first broadcast, which satirizes the gun control issue.
 November 6: The Simpsons episode "The Two Mrs. Nahasapeemapetilons" is first broadcast, in which Apu Nahasapeemapetilon marries Manjula Nahasapeemapetilon.
 November 14: Don Bluth and Gary Goldman's Anastasia premiers.
 November 18: Motion Painting No. 1 and Tulips Shall Grow are added to the National Film Registry.
 November 28: The final episode of Beavis and Butt-Head is broadcast.

December
 December 2: Anime producer Yoshinobu Nishizaki is arrested for drug possession with 50g of stimulants, 7g of morphine, 9g of marijuana. While on bail he goes to the Philippines on his English-registered cruiser the Ocean Nine; returning to smuggle in an M16 with M203 grenade launcher, a Glock 17, and a large amount of ammunition.
 December 6: The final episode of Aaahh!!! Real Monsters airs. 
 December 16: The airing of the Pokémon episode "Dennō Senshi Porygon" causes photosensitive epileptic seizures among more than 600 viewers in Japan, prompting the series to have a four-month hiatus.
 December 17: The South Park episode "Mr. Hankey, the Christmas Poo" first airs, in which Mr. Hankey, Mr. Mackey and Father Maxi make their debut.
 December 25: Adarna: The Mythical Bird premiers in the Philippines, becoming the first feature-length animated Filipino film.

Specific date unknown
 Hanna-Barbera closed its studio doors in Hollywood, California, one year after Time Warner purchased Turner Broadcasting System.
 Milan Blažeković' Lapitch the Little Shoemaker premiers.
 Ray Nowland's Go to Hell!! premiers, an animated feature animated completely by one person.

Awards
Mainichi Film Award for Best Film: Princess Mononoke
Japan Academy Prize for Picture of the Year: Princess Mononoke

Films released

 January 10 - Deep Sea Fleet: Submarine 707 (Japan)
 January 24:
 Alien from the Darkness (Japan)
 The Quest for the Key to Heaven (Sweden)
 February 4 - VeggieTales: Very Silly Songs! (United States)
 February 11:
 Droids: The Pirates and the Prince (United States and Canada)
 Ewoks: The Haunted Village (United States and Canada)
 Hercules (United States)
 February 18 - Underground Adventure (United States and Canada)
 March 6 - The Little Bastard (Germany)
 March 8: 
 Doraemon: Nobita and the Spiral City (Japan)
 Jigoku Sensei Nūbē: Gozen 0 toki Nūbē Shisu (Japan)
 March 11 - Journey Beneath the Sea (United States and Canada)
 March 15:
 The Dog of Flanders: The Movie (Japan)
 Evangelion: Death and Rebirth (Japan)
 March 26:
 Cats Don't Dance (United States)
 Dragon Ball GT: A Hero's Legacy (Japan)
 March 28:
 Mondo Plympton (United States)
 Spy of Darkness (Japan)
 March 29 - Kikansha Sensei (Japan)
 April 8 - Mighty Ducks the Movie: The First Face-Off (United States)
 April 12 - Hermes – Winds of Love (Japan)
 April 19:
 Case Closed: The Time-Bombed Skyscraper (Japan)
 Crayon Shin-chan: Pursuit of the Balls of Darkness (Japan)
 Tiny Heroes (Hungary, (Germany, and United States)
 April 22 - VeggieTales: Larry-Boy! and the Fib from Outer Space! (United States)
 April 25 - City Hunter: The Motion Picture (Japan)
 May - Tom and Fluffy (Estonia)
 May 11 - Jiang de Kailaban jue (China and Germany)
 May 15 - The Count of Monte Cristo (Canada and United States)
 May 20:
 Anastasia (United States and Japan)
 The Brave Little Toaster to the Rescue (United States)
 May 21 - Psycho Diver: Soul Siren (Japan)
 June 23 - Lapitch the Little Shoemaker (Croatia and Germany)
 June 27 - Hercules (United States)
 July 5 - Elmer's Adventure: My Father's Dragon (Japan)
 July 10 - Dibu: The Movie (Argentina)
 July 12 - Princess Mononoke (Japan)
 July 13 - Beauty and the Beast (United States)
 July 18 - The Swan Princess: Escape from Castle Mountain (United States)
 July 19 - The End of Evangelion (Japan)
 July 22:
 The Day the Earth Moved (Japan)
 Fujimi Orchestra (Japan)
 July 26 - A Chinese Ghost Story: The Tsui Hark Animation (Hong Kong)
 July 28 - Soreike! Anpanman Niji no Piramiddo (Japan)
 August 1:
 Jungle Emperor Leo (Japan)
 Lupin III: Island of Assassins (Japan)
 August 2:
 Slayers Great (Japan)
 Tenchi the Movie 2: The Daughter of Darkness (Japan)
 August 5:
 Perfect Blue (Japan)
 Pooh's Grand Adventure: The Search for Christopher Robin (United States)
 August 22 - Pippi Longstocking (Sweden, Germany, and Canada)
 September 8 - I Married a Strange Person! (United States)
 September 12 - Licca-chan to Yamaneko Hoshi no Tabi (Japan)
 September 13:
 Spur to Glory: The Igaya Chiharu Story (Japan)
 The Ugly Duckling (United Kingdom)
 September 20 - Spacibo at the End of the Edo Period (Japan)
 October 2 - The Fearless Four (Germany, United States, and United Kingdom)
 October 4 - The Batman/Superman Movie: World's Finest (United States)
 October 11 - A Christmas Carol (United States)
 October 14 - Babes in Toyland (United States)
 October 21 - Annabelle's Wish (United States)
 October 25 - Kigyō Senshi Yamazaki: Long Distance Call (Japan)
 November 11: 
 Beauty and the Beast: The Enchanted Christmas (United States and Canada)
 Twilight of the Dark Master (Japan)
 November 18 - VeggieTales: Josh and the Big Wall! (United States)
 November 21 - Anastasia (United States)
 December 4 - Benjamin Bluemchen (Germany and Luxembourg)
 December 9 - The Land Before Time V: The Mysterious Island (United States)
 December 25: 
 Adarna: The Mythical Bird (Philippines)
 The Secret of Anastasia (United States)
 Specific date unknown:
 Go to Hell!! (Australia)
 Home of Acorns (Japan)
 Hua Mulan (Italy)
 Katharina & Witt, Fiction and Reality (Germany)
 Megasónicos (Spain)
 Merry Christmas Little Moonky! (Belgium and France)
 Neznayka on the Moon (Russia)
 The Perfume of the Invisible One (France and Italy)
 Pocahontas and the Spider Woman (Italy)

Television series debuts

Television series endings

Births

January
January 21: Jeremy Shada, American actor, musician and singer (voice of Finn in the Adventure Time franchise, Jean Francois in Team America: World Police, young Robin in Batman: The Brave and the Bold, Pug in ParaNorman, Cody Maverick in Surf's Up 2: WaveMania, Lance in Voltron: Legendary Defender, Tom Kullersen in Dragons: The Nine Realms, Porridge in the Chowder episode "My Big Fat Stinky Wedding").
January 24: Jonah Bobo, American actor (voice of Austin in The Backyardigans, Tod in The Fox and the Hound 2).

February
 February 10: Chloë Grace Moretz, American actress and model (voice of Darby in My Friends Tigger & Pooh, young Penny in Bolt, Snow White in Red Shoes and the Seven Dwarfs, Wednesday Addams in The Addams Family and The Addams Family 2, the title character in Nimona, Furi in The Emperor's New School episode "Kuzcogarten", Honey in the American Dad! episode "Steve & Snot's Test-Tubular Adventure", Boodles in the Mickey Mouse Clubhouse episode "Mickey's Monster Musical").
 February 11: Jenny Yokobori, American voice actress (voice of Dashi in Octonauts and the Caves of Sac Acturn and Octonauts and the Great Barrier Reef, Kuromi in Hello Kitty and Friends: Supercute Adventures, Jade Hunter and Ainsley Slater in Rainbow High, Laser Baby in The Boys Presents: Diabolical episode "Laser Baby's Day Out", Japanese Girl in the Central Park episode "Rival Busker", continued voice of Kumiko Albertson in The Simpsons).

March
 March 3: Nissae Isen, Canadian voice actress (voice of George in Miss BG, Ivy in Miss Spider's Sunny Patch Friends, Thor in Captain Flamingo, Jade in My Friend Rabbit, Yuri in My Big Big Friend, Trollee in Mike the Knight, Ayla Elephant in Babar and the Adventures of Badou, Juanita in the Atomic Betty episode "Takes One to Know One", adult D.W. Read in the Arthur episode "All Grown Up").
 March 18: Ciara Bravo, American actress, singer, and comedian (voice of Giselita in Open Season).
 March 30: Gideon Adlon, American actress (voice of Hayley Travis in Pacific Rim: The Black, ZaZa Royale in Battle Kitty, Dawn Marie in Slippin' Jimmy, Circle in Shape Island, Phantom Girl in Legion of Super-Heroes, Lydia in the Solar Opposites episode "The Matter Transfer Array").

April
 April 15: Maisie Williams, English actress (voice of Goona in Early Man, Cammie MacCloud in Gen:Lock).
 April 24: Marisa Davila, American actress (voice of Alex Rose in Super Giant Robot Brothers).

May
 May 11: Lana Condor, American actress, producer, and singer (voice of Kaoru in Rilakkuma and Kaoru, Casey McGarry in BoJack Horseman, Ruby Gillman in Ruby Gillman, Teenage Kraken).
 May 12: Odeya Rush, Israeli actress and model (voice of Samara in Pantheon).

July
 July 30: Finneas O'Connell, American singer, songwriter (Turning Red), record producer and actor (voice of Jesse in Turning Red, himself in The Simpsons short "When Billie Met Lisa").

August
 August 23: Lil Yachty, American rapper (voice of Green Lantern in Teen Titans Go! To the Movies).

October 
 October 6: Michael J. Woodard, American singer and actor (voice of Arlo Beauregard in Arlo the Alligator Boy and I Heart Arlo).
 October 7: Kira Kosarin, American actress and singer (voice of Shannon in Lucky).
 October 10: Grace Rolek, American singer and voice actress (voice of Connie Maheswaran in the Steven Universe franchise, Louise in Lou and Lou: Safety Patrol, Molly in the Special Agent Oso episode "Gold Flower").
 October 23: Zach Callison, American actor (voice of the title character in the Steven Universe franchise, Prince James in Sofia the First, Zuzz in Cleopatra in Space, King Tut in Mr. Peabody & Sherman, Billy Batson in Superman/Shazam!: The Return of Black Adam, Justice League: War, Lego DC Batman: Family Matters and Lego DC: Shazam!: Magic and Monsters).
 October 26: Rhenzy Feliz, American actor (voice of Camilo Madrigal in Encanto).

November
 November 1: Max Burkholder, American actor (voice of various characters in Family Guy, Blue Teammate #6 in The Ant Bully, Timmy Tibble in Arthur's Missing Pal, Roo in My Friends Tigger & Pooh, Kid Doctor and Little Boy in American Dad!, Mom's Maggot in Fly Me to the Moon, Chomper in The Land Before Time, Billy in Astro Boy, Kid, Harry Potter, Justin Bieber and Pudgy Kid in The Cleveland Show, Oliver Grayson/Kid Omni-Man and Matt in Invincible, the title character in the Random! Cartoons episode "Samsquatch", Billy Connors in The Spectacular Spider-Man episode "Natural Selection", World in the Foster's Home for Imaginary Friends episode "Destination: Imagination").

December
 December 15: Maude Apatow, American actress (voice of Justine in Pantheon).
 December 16: Spence Moore II, American actor (voice of George The Tiger in My Father's Dragon).

Deaths

January
 January 1: Al Eugster, American animator (Fleischer Studios, Ub Iwerks, Walt Disney Productions, Famous Studios), dies at age 87.
 January 8: Normand Hudon, Canadian animator and comics artist (Au P'tit Café), dies at age 67.
 January 10: Sheldon Leonard, American actor (voice of Dodsworth in Kiddin' the Kitten and A Peck o' Trouble, Kid Banty in Sock-a-Doodle-Do, the title character in Linus the Lionhearted), dies at age 89.
 January 11: Ed DeMattia, American animator (Hanna-Barbera, Captain America, Here Comes the Grump, The Pink Panther Show, The Phantom Tollbooth, Filmation, Alvin and the Chipmunks, The Simpsons, Tiny Toon Adventures, James Bond Jr.), dies at an unknown age.
 January 18: Adriana Caselotti, American actress and singer (voice of the title character in Snow White and the Seven Dwarfs), dies at age 80.

February
 February 6: Ernie Anderson, American radio and television personality, horror host, and announcer (narrated Jayce and the Wheeled Warriors, The Adventures of Super Mario Bros. 3, 2 episodes of Animaniacs, The Powerpuff Girls shorts for The What A Cartoon Show!), dies at age 73.
 February 8: Robert Ridgely, American voice actor (voice of the Purple Pie Man in Strawberry Shortcake, the title character in Thundarr the Barbarian, Al Vermin in Bonkers, and the Commander in Dexter's Laboratory), dies at 65.
 February 26:
 David Doyle, American actor (voice of Sheriff Gomer Cleghorn in the TaleSpin episode "Citizen Khan", Professor Hubert in the Road Rovers episode "A Hair of the Dog That Bit You", Sam Delaney in the Mighty Ducks: The Animated Series episode "The Human Factor", first voice of Lou Pickles in Rugrats), dies at age 67.
 Andy Houts, American animator, production assistant (Bobby's World, The Simpsons, Klasky Csupo), writer (Rugrats, Rocko's Modern Life) and actor (voice of various characters in Rugrats, Policeman in Duckman, Sloolup, Schnill and Butch in Aaahh!!! Real Monsters), dies at age 31.
 February 27: Harry Love, American animator and production coordinator (Charles Mintz, Warner Bros. Cartoons, DePatie-Freleng, The Nine Lives of Fritz the Cat), dies at age 85.

April
 April 16: Roland Topor, French novelist, illustrator, cartoonist, comics artist, film script writer, TV script writer, animator and playwright (Les Escargots, Fantastic Planet), dies at age 59.

May
 May 18: Phyllis Craig, American animator (Walt Disney Animation Studios, Hanna-Barbera) and ink and paint supervisor (Film Roman), dies at age 68.
 May 25: Peter Rangmar, Swedish comedian and actor (dub voice of Timon in The Lion King), dies at age 40.
 May 29: George Fenneman, American announcer (voice of the narrator in The Simpsons episode "Marge on the Lam"), dies from emphysema at age 77.

June
 June 24: Brian Keith, American actor (voice of Uncle Ben in Spider-Man, Duckman's Father in the Duckman episode "Kidney, Popsicle, and Nuts"), commits suicide at age 75.
 June 29: William Hickey, American actor (voice of Dr. Finklestein in The Nightmare Before Christmas), dies at age 69.

August
 August 27: Dick N. Lucas, American animator (Walt Disney Company), dies at age 77.

September
 September 6: Bianca Majolie, Italian-American story artist, animator, concept artist and writer (Walt Disney Company), dies at age 96.
 September 9: Burgess Meredith, American actor (voice of Puff the Magic Dragon in a series of TV specials, Golobulus in G.I. Joe: The Movie), dies at age 89.

October
 October 7: Wan Laiming, Chinese animator and film director (founder of the Shanghai Animation Film Studio, Shuzhendong Chinese Typewriter, Uproar in the Studio, The Camel's Dance, Princess Iron Fan, Havoc in Heaven, Why is the Crow Black-Coated), dies at age 97.
 October 18: Milt Neil, American comics artist and animator (Walt Disney Company, Walter Lantz), dies at age 83.
 October 22: 
 Per Lygum, Danish animator and comics artist (worked for the animation department of Marten Toonder, directed 1980s Christmas TV commercial for Tuborg Beer), dies at age 64.
 Leonid Amalrik, Russian animator (Black and White, The Grey Neck, Thumbelina), dies at age 92.
 October 24: Don Messick, American voice actor (voice of Boo-Boo Bear and Ranger Smith in Yogi Bear, Bamm-Bamm Rubble in The Flintstones, Astro in The Jetsons, Muttley in Wacky Races and Dastardly and Muttley in Their Flying Machines, the title character in the Scooby-Doo franchise), dies at age 71.

November
 November 12: Tom Chang, Taiwanese pop vocalist, songwriter, actor, and record producer (dub voice of teenager Hercules in Hercules), dies at age 31.

December
 December 6: Eliot Daniel, American songwriter (Walt Disney Company), dies at age 89. Alongside Johnny Lange, he wrote the classic Western song "Blue Shadows on the Trail".
 December 16: Lillian Disney, American ink artist (Walt Disney Animation Studios) and widow of Walt Disney, dies at age 98.

Specific date unknown
 Frank Little, American animator and comics artist (Terrytoons), dies at age 90.

See also
1997 in anime

References

External links 
Animated works of the year, listed in the IMDb

 
1990s in animation